Spinicalliotropis spinosa is a species of sea snail, a marine gastropod mollusk in the family Eucyclidae.

Original description
 (of Calliotropis spinosa Poppe, Tagaro & Dekker, 2006) Poppe G.T., Tagaro S.P. & Dekker H. (2006) The Seguenziidae, Chilodontidae, Trochidae, Calliostomatidae and Solariellidae of the Philippine Islands. Visaya Supplement 2: 1–228.

Distribution
This marine species occurs off Mindoro Island, the Philippines.

References

External links
 Worms Link

spinosa
Gastropods described in 2006